WSYM-TV (channel 47) is a television station in Lansing, Michigan, United States, affiliated with Fox and MyNetworkTV. Owned by the E. W. Scripps Company, the station has studios on West Saint Joseph Street (along I-496) in downtown Lansing, and its transmitter is located in Hamlin Township along M-50/M-99/South Clinton Trail.

History

WSYM signed on for the first time on December 1, 1982, as WFSL-TV. It was owned by Lansing businessman Joel Ferguson and his company, F&S Development Company, and aired an analog signal on channel 47. WFSL was the first new commercial station in the area since WILX-TV signed-on 23 years earlier. Conventional wisdom suggested it should have debuted as an ABC affiliate. Lansing was one of the largest markets in the nation that still didn't have full service from all three major networks. Indeed, Lansing had been large enough to support three full network affiliates since the 1960s. However, after all attempts to land an ABC affiliation failed, it signed on as an independent. Flint's WJRT-TV (channel 12) had long been the default ABC affiliate in Lansing, since it covered the immediate area with an adequate signal.

During its pre-sign-on test pattern, an on-screen crawl thanked numerous people and companies for their help including "All the people who said 'No way will that station get on-the-air by December 1st.'" WFSL was a typical UHF independent airing syndicated cartoons, game shows, movies, and off-network sitcoms. For a time, the station also simulcast the ABC game show Family Feud and soap opera The Edge of Night from eventual sister station WXYZ-TV in Detroit in hopes of eventually landing a full-time ABC affiliation.

Ferguson sold the station to the Journal Company, then the broadcast arm of the Milwaukee Journal, in 1985, as the second broadcast asset for that company outside of Milwaukee. The new owners changed the call sign to WSYM-TV—an acronym meaning "We Say Yes to Michigan", in reference to the "Yes Michigan!" tourism campaign of the 1980s from the Michigan Economic Development Corporation (the station still uses that phrase as part of its on-air imaging today). The call letters once belonged to a ship but that registration was canceled by the United States Coast Guard to allow channel 47 to use them. Five years later, Ferguson used the proceeds from the sale of this station to start Lansing's first ABC affiliate, WLAJ.

WSYM affiliated with Fox in 1990. Previously, Detroit's WKBD served as the "fourth" network's default affiliate in Lansing; it had been available on cable in Lansing for decades. Some parts of the market could also receive Fox from WXMI in Grand Rapids and WSMH in Flint. WSYM is also part of the Detroit Lions Television Network which airs Detroit Lions pre-season games and the syndicated Ford Lions Report during the regular season. It airs Lions games during the regular season as part of the NFL on Fox contract. The Detroit Tigers also appear on this station during Fox Saturday Baseball.

On July 30, 2014, it was announced that the E. W. Scripps Company would acquire Journal Communications in an all-stock transaction. The combined firm would retain their broadcast properties, including WSYM, and spin off their print assets as Journal Media Group (acquired by Gannett in a later transaction). The deal would make WSYM a sister station to WXYZ and WMYD in Detroit. Also in July 2014, WSYM began operating MyNetworkTV outlet WHTV through a local marketing agreement. That station was previously operated by Media General (owner of CBS affiliate WLNS-TV) and was based out of that station's facility. Through the new arrangement with WSYM, WHTV would offer additional local programming. The FCC approved the deal on December 12, 2014. It was approved by shareholders on March 11, 2015. It closed on April 1.

Programming

Syndicated programming
Syndicated programming on WSYM-TV includes The Big Bang Theory, Judge Judy, Hot Bench, Modern Family, and Last Man Standing among others.

News operation
WSYM-TV presently broadcasts 33½ hours of locally produced newscasts each week (with 5½ hours each weekday and three hours each on Saturdays and Sundays).

In its early days of operation, the station produced three live news updates throughout the day. This included one in the morning, another during the afternoon, and late at night. The short cut-ins ranged from five to ten minutes in length. Under pressure from Fox to start a full newscast or face disaffiliation, WSYM launched a full news department in September 1997. During this time, it produced local news seen weeknights at 5:30 (for thirty minutes), every night at 10, and a Sunday night sports highlight show. By 2004, the station would shut down its in-house news operation.

However, since Fox had by this time required its affiliates to offer newscasts where possible, WSYM entered into a news share agreement with NBC affiliate WILX (owned by Gray Television) in order to maintain a news presence on the station. At that time, WSYM was the only Journal-owned station to outsource news production to a big three affiliate. Under the arrangement, WILX produces local news for WSYM in a similar schedule of weeknights at 6:30 (also for a half-hour; originally at 5:30 until WILX launched its own 5:30 newscast in October 2018) and every night at 10 (for sixty minutes). On October 5, 2015, WILX began producing a weekday morning show for WSYM titled Fox 47 Morning News at 7. Airing each weekday morning for two hours, this newscast is WSYM's first attempt at morning news (aside from reruns of previous newscasts). For several years, WSYM continued to maintain its former set and anchor desk for the purposes of pundit segments and live shots for Fox News Channel which required reporting on state government events in Lansing.

Prior to that newscast's launch, on weekday mornings at 9, the previous night's 10 o'clock show was replayed on WSYM under the branding Fox 47 Morning News Rewind. The weekend edition of Morning News Rewind still continues to air at 6 a.m. on Saturday and Sunday morning.

All newscasts seen on this Fox outlet originate from the NBC affiliate's studios on American Road in Lansing (near I-96) featuring unique duratrans that indicate the Fox-branded shows. Although the two stations shared most on-air personnel, WSYM maintains separate news anchors and meteorologists on weeknights and weekday mornings that are not seen on WILX. In cases of severe weather (most notably during a tornado warning), it may carry the primary feed from the NBC outlet in which one of that outlet's meteorologists appears on WSYM. Other anchor personnel from WILX filled in when needed.

All local newscasts seen on the station feature a separate graphics scheme and news music package from WILX (updated to a new set of Gray Television-corporate graphics on February 17, 2014). During weather forecast segments, WSYM features WILX's Doppler weather radar that is based at the NBC affiliate's American Road facility.

WSYM once had competition to its prime time news at 10 that lasted from September 24, 2007 until September 25, 2009. During this time, WLAJ produced a weeknight prime time show on its CW-affiliated second digital subchannel. On January 28, 2011, WILX became the first outlet in Central Michigan to upgrade local newscasts to high definition level. WSYM would not follow with a transition to HD broadcasts until June 13 because it needed to upgrade the master control at its separate studios in order to transmit the news in high definition.

On May 2, 2012, the station began providing a live video simulcast of WJIM (1240)'s talk radio program Michigan's Big Show (hosted by Michael Patrick Shiels) on weekday mornings from 6 until 8. At some point in time, WSYM added segments at 6:30 and 7:30 (branded as The Morning Blend) during Michigan's Big Show. The advertorial segments were produced through the station's advertising sales department and were recorded in advance, and were the same type of advertiser product presentations seen on other The Morning Blend shows produced by most of Journal's stations.

That effort and the simulcast of Michigan's Big Show was discontinued with the launch of Fox 47 Morning News at 7. With WSYM now being a sister station of WXYZ, a half-hour simulcast of that outlet's weekday morning newscast has been added to WSYM. Airing at 6:30, it is branded as 7 Action News This Morning on Fox 47 and features Detroit-based coverage although statewide news headlines are included. WSYM does provide local weather segments during the program.

On October 8, 2020, Scripps announced that WSYM will reinstate its news department in early 2021, thus ending its news share agreement with WILX. The operation launched at the start of January 2021, with contributions additionally coming from adjacent-market sister stations WXMI (where weather segments also originate) and WXYZ-TV as the station establishes a more permanent studio presence in Lansing.

Notable former on-air staff
Ahmed Fareed – sports anchor (2003–2004, now studio host/reporter at NBC Sports Bay Area)

Technical information

Subchannels 
The station's digital signal is multiplexed:

Originally, WSYM-DT2 featured the TheCoolTV. MeTV was added on October 1, 2011 on 47.2 and is available on Comcast digital channel 296. A lawsuit filed by Journal Communications for "non-payment of broadcast operations" against TheCoolTV's parent company and the oncoming removal of TheCoolTV from Journal's stations in Wisconsin, resulted in MeTV replacing TheCoolTV on 47.2, and proving far more successful.

On October 6, 2014, WSYM-TV added Bounce TV to a newly created third subchannel.

Because of WHTV's termination, WSYM added MyNetworkTV programming to its fourth subchannel (along with much of WHTV's former schedule) on October 9, 2017 with the branding "My 47.4". In May 2019, an additional fifth subchannel was added carrying Court TV.

Analog-to-digital conversion 
WSYM-TV shut down its analog signal, over UHF channel 47, on June 12, 2009, as part of the federally mandated transition from analog to digital television. The station's digital signal remained on its pre-transition UHF channel 38, using PSIP to display WSYM-TV's virtual channel as 47 on digital television receivers.

References

External links
WSYM-TV "Fox 47" (can be entered into wireless device for mobile access)

Fox network affiliates
Television channels and stations established in 1982
SYM-TV
Grit (TV network) affiliates
Bounce TV affiliates
Court TV affiliates
E. W. Scripps Company television stations
1982 establishments in Michigan